The 2018 Campeonato Pernambucano (officially the Pernambucano da Série A1 de 2018) was the 104th edition of the state championship of Pernambuco organized by FPF. The championship began on 17 January and ended on 8 April. Sport were the defending champions, but were eliminated by Central in the semi-finals.

Náutico defeated Central 2–1 on aggregate to win their 22nd Campeonato Pernambucano title, the first one since 2004. As champions, Náutico qualified for the 2019 Copa do Brasil and 2019 Copa do Nordeste.

Central and Sport qualified for 2019 Copa do Brasil as runners-up and third placed team, respectively.

Sport declined to participate in the 2019 Copa do Nordeste. They were replaced by Santa Cruz (best second-team in the 2018 RNC). Salgueiro qualified for 2019 Pré-Copa do Nordeste via RNC.

Teams

Eleven teams were competing, ten returning from the 2017 and one promoted from the 2017 Pernambucano A2 Championship (Pesqueira).

Schedule
The schedule of the competition was as follows.

First stage
In the first stage, each team played the other 10 teams in a single round-robin tournament. The teams were ranked according to points (3 points for a win, 1 point for a draw, and 0 points for a loss). If tied on points, the following criteria would be used to determine the ranking: 1. Wins; 2. Goal difference; 3. Goals scored; 4. Head-to-head; 5. Fewest red cards; 6. Fewest yellow cards; 7. Draw in the headquarters of the FPF.

Top eight teams advanced to the quarter-finals of the final stages. The two teams with the lowest number of points were relegated to the 2019 Campeonato Pernambucano A2. Top three teams not already qualified for 2019 Série A, Série B or Série C qualified for 2019 Série D.

Standings

Results

Final stages
Starting from the quarter-finals, the teams played a single-elimination tournament with the following rules:
Quarter-finals, semi-finals and third place match were played on a single-leg basis, with the higher-seeded team hosting the leg.
 If tied, the penalty shoot-out would be used to determine the winner.
Finals were played on a home-and-away two-legged basis, with the higher-seeded team hosting the second leg.
 If tied on aggregate, the penalty shoot-out would be used to determine the winner.
Extra time was not played and away goals rule was not used in final stages.

Bracket

Quarter-finals

|}

Matches

Semi-finals

|}

Matches

Náutico qualified for the 2019 Copa do Brasil.

Central qualified for the 2019 Copa do Brasil.

Third place match

Sport qualified for the 2019 Copa do Brasil.

Finals

Matches

Náutico won 2–1 on aggregate and qualified for the 2019 Copa do Nordeste.

Top goalscorers

2018 Campeonato Pernambucano team
The 2018 Campeonato Pernambucano team was a squad consisting of the eleven most impressive players at the tournament.

||

References

Campeonato Pernambucano seasons
Pernambucano